The women's high jump event was part of the track and field athletics programme at the 1936 Summer Olympics. The competition was held on August 9, 1936.  The final was won by Ibolya Csák of Hungary. Gretel Bergmann, a German Jewish athlete, was prevented from competing by the Nazis.

Results

Final standings

References

Athletics at the 1936 Summer Olympics
High jump at the Olympics
1936 in women's athletics
Ath